Pulstate is the alias of Irish trance music producer Desmond Mallon.  His tracks to date are "Lost Forever", "Wicked", "Swag", "Somnia", "Siriya" and most recently "The Joker". He has worked on the Armada record label, started by the world's No.1 DJ Armin Van Buuren, having featured on numerous compilations released by the label. He currently releases mainly on Interstate Recordings, a sublabel of the UK based record label, Infrasonic Recordings.

During an interview with magazine Pumped Audio in 2012, it was stated that Desmond is the youngest musician to ever release a dance music track through a record label in Irish history.

Original tracks 
 Pulstate - Oiche Nollag [Ocean Drive Records]
 Pulstate - Fuel The Passion [Infrasonic Progressive]
 Pulstate - Lost Forever [Infrasonic Progressive]
 Pulstate & Juventa - Somnia [Infrasonic Recordings]
 Pulstate - Wicked [Interstate Recordings]
 Pulstate - Swag [Interstate Recordings]
 Pulstate - Siriya/Furtive EP [Harmonic Breeze Records]
 Pulstate - The Joker/The Ace EP [Interstate Recordings]
 Pulstate - All Else Fails [Infrasonic Recordings]
 Pulstate & Andy Tau - Alliance [Infrasonic Recordings]

Remixes 
 Six Senses - Cosmic Belt (Pulstate Remix) [Infrasonic Recordings]
 Andy Tau - The Path (Pulstate Remix) [Infrasonic Recordings]
 Ehren Stowers - Both Worlds (Pulstate Remix) [Perceptive Recordings]
 Kiholm - Lumpini Park (Pulstate Remix) [Infrasonic Recordings]
 Phuture Sound - Eternal Gravity (Pulstate Remix) [Infrasonic Progressive]
 Solis & Sean Truby - Empathy (Pulstate & Juventa Remix) [Infrasonic Recordings]
 Liquid Vision - Add To Cart (Pulstate Remix) [Interstate Recordings]
 Kamil Esten - Edem (Pulstate Remix) [Infrasonic Recordings]

References

1992 births
Armada Music artists
Irish record producers
Irish trance musicians
Living people